CBC News: Country Canada (until January 2006 titled Country Canada) was a Canadian television series broadcast on CBC Television.  It was produced by CBC Winnipeg, and profiled rural and country life in Canada.

Sandy Cushon was Country Canadas host between 1975 and 2000. In its final years it was hosted by Reg Sherren.

Country Canada began on February 20, 1955 as Country Calendar, and was also produced by CBWT.

On April 4, 2007, CBC announced the cancellation of Country Canada at the end of that season, after 54 years. The last broadcast was Sept. 16, 2007.

In 2001, the CBC and Corus Entertainment launched a digital television channel fashioned after Country Canada. Now the service is called Cottage Life and is owned by Blue Ant Media. Programming on the channel includes the long-running British soap opera Emmerdale.

References

External links

 Country Canada program guide webpage

CBC Television original programming
1954 Canadian television series debuts
2007 Canadian television series endings
2000s Canadian documentary television series
Black-and-white Canadian television shows
Television shows filmed in Winnipeg